The 2000s are the decade from 2000 to 2009.

2000s may also refer to:

 The century from 2000 to 2099, almost synonymous with the 21st century (2001-2100)
 The millennium from 2000 to 2999, almost synonymous with the 3rd millennium (2001-3000)
 The 2000s (miniseries), a CNN documentary regarding events that occurred in the 2000s

See also
 2000 (number)

gd:2000an